Rajendrudu Gajendrudu is a 1993 Telugu-language comedy film, produced by K. Achi Reddy under Manisha Films, presented by Kishore Rathi and directed by S. V. Krishna Reddy. The film stars Rajendra Prasad, Soundarya  and music composed by S. V. Krishna Reddy. The film recorded as Blockbuster at the box office. The film was remade in Hindi as Jodidar, with Mithun Chakraborthy.

This is the story of an elephant taking revenge on killers of its past owner with the help of an unemployed man. The elephant was given a special training before the shooting started.

Plot
Gajendra is an elephant who is owned by a forest officer (Gummadi). Suddenly, Gajendra's master is killed by a poacher (Vidya Sagar) because of the master threatening him that he'll give a police complaint if the villain doesn't stop his business. After Gajendra's master's death, Gajendra starts roaming around on the city roads and then he is later used as a lottery special prize in a local area. Rajendra (Rajendra Prasad) is a poor man with an assistant Gundu (Gundu Hanumantha Rao). Rajendra and Gundu once try to escape from Kotlingam (Kota Srinivasa Rao), their house owner who tells and forces them to vacate the house because they didn't pay the rent for months. Later, Gundu tells Rajendra that he got a lottery award as an elephant who is Gajendra. Since they still don't have any money, they keep blackmailing and cheating people for money. But finally, they stop that and come to a solution going to the bank and asking the bank manager (Brahmanandam) for a loan. Rajendra and Gundu get the loan and start living happily. Later on, he meets in a fight with Alaka (Soundarya) and both of them hate each other and keep fighting forever. At one point, Kotlingam asks Gajendra to push the swing that he's sitting on. Gajendra starts pushing it, but Kotlingam asks him to push harder. Gajendra accepts that but pushes the swing extremely hard, and Kotlingam falls off and gets hurt. With revenge in mind, Alaka goes and cuts out a wooden piece from a ledge and feeds that to Gajendra by tricking him. The next day, Alaka starts thinking that she had tortured Gajendra and tells that to one of her friends. At the moment, Gajendra is right in front of her with a barrel. He rolls the barrel at her and then Alaka is then bad-handed by the main villain's goons. Then Gajendra`saves her and Alaka seeks Gajendra's forgiveness for misleading him. With the chance of that, Alaka goes and proposes to Rajendra. Besides the comical plot, a seller (Babu Mohan), and a guy who always talks gibberish and claiming that as a language, Chata (Ali) keep roaming around annoying everybody who later told the truth that he knew the language Telugu.

Cast

 Rajendra Prasad as Rajendra
 Soundarya as Alaka
 Kota Srinivasa Rao as Kotlingam
 Brahmanandam as Bank Manager
 Babu Mohan as Seller
 Ali as Chata
 Mallikarjuna Rao as Murugan
 Gundu Hanumantha Rao as Gundu
 Gummadi as Gajendra's Master 
 Vidya Sagar as the Main Villlan
 Anath as Doctor
 Ironleg Sastri as Veterinary Doctor
 Gautam Raju as Astrologer
 Dham as Constable 
 Narsing Yadav as Goon
 Sri Lakshmi as Kotlingam's wife
 Jayalalita as Ammadu
 Ratnasagar as Bank Manager's wife
 Kalpana Rai

Soundtrack

References

External links
 

1993 films
Films directed by S. V. Krishna Reddy
Films scored by S. V. Krishna Reddy
1990s Telugu-language films
Telugu films remade in other languages
1993 directorial debut films